The Even Dozen Jug Band is the debut and only studio album by the American jug band Even Dozen Jug Band, released in 1964.

Founded in 1963, the Even Dozen Jug Band recorded this, their only recording for Elektra Records. Members who later went on to successful music careers included Stefan Grossman, David Grisman, Steve Katz, Maria Muldaur (then Maria d'Amato), Joshua Rifkin, and John Sebastian.

Reception

Music critic Ronnie D. Lankford, Jr. in his Allmusic  "Mandolins, banjoes, pianos, guitars, fiddles, kazoos, and trombones vie with one another, creating a raucous free-for-all. The vocals on pieces like "Overseas Stomp" and "Evolution Mama" have a loose, just-for-the-heck-of-it feel that keeps the material lively and irreverent. The multiple combinations of instruments and voices, along with an exuberant approach, guarantee no boredom on this lovely disc. Certainly no stickler for strict traditionalism, the band shows how blues, ragtime, and jazz can be used to freshen up worn-out material."

Reissues
 Ten of the songs were reissued in 1978 on Jug Band Music & Rags of the South by Everest Archive of Folk & Jazz Music.
The Even Dozen Jug Band was reissued on CD in 2002 and again in 2008 by Collectors' Choice Music.
The Even Dozen Jug Band was reissued on CD in 2005 by Elektra Records.

Track listing
All songs Traditional unless otherwise noted.

Side one
 "Take Your Fingers Off It" (Will Shade, Charlie Burse, J. Jones, C. Pierce) – 2:26
 "Come on In" – 2:42
 "Mandolin King Rag" – 1:47
 "Overseas Stomp" (Will Shade, Jab Jones) – 1:45
 "Evolution Mama" – 3:19
 "The Even Dozens" (Josh Rifkin, G. Davis) – 2:55
 "I Don't Love Nobody" – 2:56

Side two
 "Rag Mama" – 2:13
 "France Blues" – 2:42
 "On the Road Again" (Shade, Jones) – 3:18
 "Original Colossal Drag Rag" (Rifkin) – 2:59
 "All Worn Out" – 2:51
 "Lonely One in This Town" (Walter Jacobs, Lonnie Carter) – 3:02
 "Sadie Green" – 2:10

Personnel
Stefan Grossman – vocals, guitar, banjo
Pete Jacobson – vocals, guitar, banjo
Pete Seigel – vocals, guitar, banjo  
Frank Goodkin – banjo 
David Grisman – mandolin
Fred Weisz – violin  
Steve Katz – vocals, washboard  
Josh Rifkin – vocals, piano, kazoo
John Sebastian, credited as John Benson – harmonica  
Danny Lauffer – jug
Peggy Haine – jug
Maria Muldaur, then Maria D'Amato – vocals
Bob Gurland – trumpet, vocals
Production notes:
Paul Rothchild – producer, editing
Paul Nelson – original liner notes
Richie Unterberger – reissue liner notes

References

External links
Discography site
Reissue liner notes by Richie Unterberger
Individual track details

1964 debut albums
David Grisman albums
Maria Muldaur albums
Elektra Records albums
Albums produced by Paul A. Rothchild